Bu Luotuo or Baeuqloxdoh  (Zhuang: Baeuqloxdoh) is the supreme god and the creator in Zhuang mythology and Moism of Zhuang people. He is associated with the creation of world and the make of the rule.

In many literature of Zhuang mythology, Baeuqloxdoh is one of three kings (the ruler of the three aspects of the world):

 Gyaj (God of thunder, the ruler of the heaven),
 Ngweg (Dragon king, the ruler of the water),
 and Baeuqloxdoh  (the ruler of human world), sometimes including the tiger (the ruler of the forest).

He lives in the cave of a mountain with his wife, goddess Moloxgyap, and in every ceremony of Moism, the flamen have to call them for help.

Chinese gods
Zhuang people